The 1996–97 Kansas Jayhawks men's basketball team represented the University of Kansas in the 1996–97 NCAA Division I men's basketball season, which was the Jayhawks' 99th basketball season. The head coach was Roy Williams, who served his 9th year at KU. The team played its home games in Allen Fieldhouse in Lawrence, Kansas. It was the Jayhawks first year in the newly formed Big 12 Conference. The Big 12 conference was formed by the eight teams of the recently dissolved Big Eight Conference and was joined by Baylor, Texas, Texas A&M, and Texas Tech, all formally of the Southwest Conference which had dissolved following the 1995–1996 school year as well.

Roster

Big 12 Conference standings

Schedule 

|-
!colspan=12 style=| Regular Season
|-

|-

|-
!colspan=12 style=| Big 12 Tournament

|-
!colspan=12 style=| NCAA tournament

Rankings 

*There was no coaches poll in week 1.

Team players in the 1997 NBA Draft

References 

Kansas Jayhawks men's basketball seasons
Kansas
Kansas
Jay
Jay